Return to V is the second solo studio album by the drum and bass DJ Roni Size. It was released in 2004. The album was influenced by Size's love of soul music; many of the songs make use of vocalists.

"The Streets" was featured in the 2005 racing video game Juiced.

Critical reception
The album drew mixed to positive reviews. CMJ New Music Report called it a "solid drum 'n' bass record," but expressed disappointment that Size had not developed his sound.

Track listing

References

2004 albums
Roni Size albums